Tommi Saarinen (born 31 January 1995) is a Finnish professional footballer who plays for FC Honka, as a midfielder.

Career
Saarinen started his career with FC Honka.

On 21 November 2019 it was confirmed, that Saarinen would join Kokkolan Palloveikot for the 2020 season, signing a deal until the end of 2021.

References

1995 births
Living people
Finnish footballers
Pallohonka players
FC Honka players
Kokkolan Palloveikot players
Kakkonen players
Ykkönen players
Veikkausliiga players
Association football midfielders
Footballers from Espoo